Nayden Stanchev (born 14 January 1949) is a Bulgarian boxer. He competed at the 1972 Summer Olympics and the 1976 Summer Olympics.

References

1949 births
Living people
Bulgarian male boxers
Olympic boxers of Bulgaria
Boxers at the 1972 Summer Olympics
Boxers at the 1976 Summer Olympics
Sportspeople from Plovdiv
Light-middleweight boxers